Jack Sheridan may refer to:

 Jack Sheridan (footballer) (1898–1930), Australian rules footballer
 Jack Sheridan (poet) (1905-1967), American poet and orator
 Jack Sheridan (umpire) (1862–1914), American baseball umpire
 Jack Sheridan (hurler) (born 1997), Irish hurler

See also
 John Sheridan (disambiguation)